Marriage on Approval is a 1933 pre-Code American drama film directed by Howard Higgin and starring Barbara Kent, Don Dillaway and William Farnum. It was released in the United Kingdom by British Lion under the alternative title of Married in Haste.

Synopsis
The teenage daughter of a puritanical Reverend promises him she will not marry until she is older, but after a night of heavy drinking she wakes up to find she has a husband.

Cast
 Barbara Kent as Beth MacDougall
 Don Dillaway as Larry Bennett
 William Farnum as Reverend John MacDougall
 Edward Woods as Billy McGee
 Dorothy Granger as Hortense Bailey
 Phyllis Barry as Dorothy
 Leila McIntyre as Mary MacDonald
 Lucille Ward as Mrs. Walker
 Otis Harlan as Justice of the Peace Michael O'Connors
 Clarence Geldert as Deacon Cahill

References

Bibliography
 Pitts, Michael R. Poverty Row Studios, 1929-1940. McFarland & Company, 2005.

External links
 

1933 films
1933 drama films
American drama films
Films directed by Howard Higgin
1930s English-language films
1930s American films